is a Japanese multi-awards winner television comedy series, based on the manga series Drops of God.  Produced by Nippon TV and featuring Kazuya Kamenashi, Seiichi Tanabe, Riisa Naka, Nozomi Sasaki, and Yuki Uchida, it was first broadcast on January 13, 2009, running until March 10, 2009. In the Nikkan Sports Drama Grand Prix Winter 2009 Awards, the series received awards in four of the main categories.

Cast

Main
 Kazuya Kamenashi as Shizuku Kanzaki
 Seiichi Tanabe as Issei Tōmine
 Riisa Naka as Miyabi Shinohara
 Yuki Uchida as Maki Saionji
 Naho Toda as Ryōko Kiryū
 Nozomi Sasaki as Sara
 Naoto Takenaka as Robert Toi

Guest
 Yuika Motokariya as Suzuka Watanuki
 Ai Kato as Kaori Mizusawa
 Kenta Satoi
 Denden
 Hiroko Yamashita

References

External links
  
 

Japanese drama television series
2009 in Japanese television
2009 Japanese television series debuts
2009 Japanese television series endings
Japanese television dramas based on manga
Nippon TV dramas
Comedy-drama television series
Television series about wine